Tidiane Sane (born 10 July 1985) is a Senegalese professional football midfielder.

Club history

Randers FC
Sane was signed by Randers FC in the 2006–07 season. In his first season, he scored three goals total. Sane quickly established himself in the first team after some good performances. In the 2007/2008 he managed to score six goals for his side and was a first team regular.

Sane started off the 2008–09 season in great form. He scored two goals in the first match against local rivals AGF the game ended 3–1.

In the third round Sane added to his goal tally by scoring the third goal in a 0–3 victory against Brondby IF. Thereby Sane helped Randers to temporary claim the 1st place in the league after three rounds similar to last season.

Due to these solid performances Sane gained recognition in the media and was praised for his good and all round play. As a result, he was nominated for player of the month.

After a long period with some unlucky games, resulting in relegation for Randers FC, Sane found himself on the first team squad yet again. This was partly due to the reunion with the English coach Colin Todd, whom he has described as a father.

Elazığspor
In January 2013 Sane signed for Turkish Süper Lig side Elazığspor.

Hobro IK
On 9 July 2015, Sane returned to the Danish Superliga and signed a one-year contract with Hobro IK. He said that he chose Horbo, because he knew many of the players from his time at Randers FC. He left the club after one season having 13 appearances.

References

External links

 
 official Danish Superliga stats 

1985 births
Living people
Association football midfielders
Senegalese footballers
Senegalese expatriate footballers
Randers FC players
Elazığspor footballers
Hobro IK players
Danish Superliga players
Süper Lig players
Expatriate men's footballers in Denmark
Senegalese expatriate sportspeople in Turkey
Expatriate footballers in Turkey